The Fifteenth Amendment bill to the Constitution of Pakistan (Urdu: آئین پاکستان میں پندرھویں ترمیم) was passed by National Assembly of Pakistan on 28 August 1998. It was then moved to the Senate, where it was never passed.

Amendments
The proposed amendments included addition of a new article 2B in the constitution, and amendment in Article 239 of the Constitution of Pakistan. It also sought to impose Sharia Law as supreme law in Pakistan, in light of the Objective Resolution of Pakistan. In addition to the Quran and Sunnah as is in the Constitution of Pakistan till today.

Text

See also
 Zia-ul-Haq's Islamization
 Separation of powers
 Nawaz Sharif
 Benazir Bhutto
 Pervez Musharraf
 Amendments to the Constitution of Pakistan

References

External links
 Full-text of the Fifteenth Amendment

01
Islamism in Pakistan
Sharia